The West Wing Thing is a podcast series created by the screenwriters Dave Anthony and Josh Olson. First uploaded in 2019–22, the series discusses the TV drama The West Wing (1999–2006) on an episode-by-episode basis, from a left-wing political perspective.

Early episodes were recorded in All Things Comedy in Burbank, California prior to the COVID-19 pandemic; later episodes were recorded from the hosts' homes. Heavy metal musician Collyn McCoy ("Diesel Boots") provides the theme tunes, which vary each season, as well as theme tunes for regular sections such as "West Wing Brain," "Misogyny Rundown" and "Psaki Bomb." Guests on the show included David Sirota, John Rogers, Wyatt Cenac, Matt Taibbi, Blaire Erskine, Thomas Frank, Jared Yates Sexton, Abby Martin, Eddie Pepitone, Bilge Ebiri, Lee Camp, Katie Halper, several members of Chapo Trap House, Briahna Joy Gray, Gareth Reynolds, Marianne Williamson, Nathan J. Robinson, Adam McKay, Adolph L. Reed Jr., Wil Anderson and Susan Saxe.

Episodes

Season 1

Season 2

Season 3

Season 4

Season 5

Season 6

Season 7

Reception
Writing for Book and Film Globe, Kevin L. Jones praised The West Wing Thing, saying that the hosts "gleefully tear apart each episode of the West Wing for its smugness and centrist politics and I’m all for it. And they don’t just troll the show either; they lay down a solid case for every criticism they lob. They know how show business works, they know their American history […] and they’re certain they know who’s to blame for all of the West Wing’s issues: West Wing creator Aaron Sorkin."

In Fast Company, Joe Berkowitz wrote that "Anthony and Olson don’t approach their subject with reverence. Instead, their aim is to present The West Wing as a singularly corrosive force in American politics that has perpetuated incalculable and irreparable harm on society," saying that they "offer a compelling counter-narrative to the series’ nostalgia-soaked civic celebration."

Veteran Irish journalist and former Washington correspondent Carole Coleman described The West Wing Thing as "irreverent and very funny." Irish newspaper the Athlone Advertiser said, "If you find Aaron Sorkin's smug, centrist, sexist, childish waffle infuriating you can listen along to the podcast and watch a few episodes — which is what I have been doing and finding it quite cathartic."

See also
The Dollop
The West Wing Weekly
Political podcast

References

External links
Official page

Audio podcasts
Socialist podcasts
Film and television podcasts
All Things Comedy
2019 podcast debuts
2022 podcast endings